The 2016–17 Principality Premiership was the first season of the new format of the Principality Premiership, the top tier of club rugby in Wales run by the Welsh Rugby Union. It was contested by sixteen Welsh clubs following an expansion from twelve teams. The next two seasons will be "ring-fenced" and will have no relegation until the 2018–19 season. The competition was won by Merthyr in their first season in the Premiership. The second-tier competition was won by Newport who won their first silverware since the 2003–04 Premiership season.

Structure 
The Principality Premiership's structure includes all the teams playing each other once, either home or away, before the table is split into a top 8 and bottom 8 after 15 rounds and points are reset to zero. Each team then plays each other team once, again either home or away, in their respective tier. After all fixtures have been played, a play-off system is implemented for the top 4 teams in each section to determine the winner. The play-off winner of the top 8 will be crowned 2016–17 Principality Premiership champions. This is the first season in which the "ring-fenced" system will be implemented, meaning no team is in danger of relegation until the 2018–19 season.

Teams 
After a two-season absence spent in the WRU Championship, Swansea returned to the Premiership finishing as runners-up in the 2015–16 WRU Championship. Also promoted to the Premiership, for the first time, were Championship winners Merthyr, Bargoed and RGC 1404, who narrowly finished above Pontypool to deny them a return to the Premiership after demotion in 2012.

Standings (Phase One)

Phase Two 
After 15 rounds, the table is split into a top 8 and bottom 8 and points are reset to zero. Each team now plays each other team once, either home or away, in their respective tiers to total 22 games over the entire season. After these 7 rounds, a play-off system is implemented for the top 4 teams of each tier respectively. The winners of the play-offs for Tier One are crowned 2016–17 Principality Premiership champions.

Standings (Tier One)

Fixtures (Tier One)

Semi-finals

Final

Standings (Tier Two)

Fixtures (Tier Two)

Semi-finals

Final

External links 
 

Welsh Premier Division seasons
2016–17 in Welsh rugby union
Wales